Chilean university reform was a process of liberalizing universities in Chile. The reform began in the 1960s under the administration of President Jorge Alessandri, and continued under his successors Eduardo Frei Montalva and Salvador Allende, ending following Allende's removal during the 1973 Chilean coup d'etat. The aims of the reform movement were to establish an inclusive co-government in the university administration and to establish university autonomy.

See also
2011–13 Chilean student protests
Argentine university reform of 1918

References

History of education in Chile
Presidency of Salvador Allende
University reform
Reform in Chile